"Sad Mood" is a song by American singer-songwriter Sam Cooke, released on November 8, 1960 by RCA Victor. Arranged and conducted by Sammy Lowe, the song charted within the top 30 of Billboard Hot R&B Sides chart and the Billboard Hot 100.

Background
"Sad Mood" was first recorded in Cooke's second singles session for RCA on April 13, 1960. The song was set aside after four takes, with Cooke unhappy with the way it was working. Cooke gave it another go on October 1, 1960, this time with "strings, an all-star rhythm section, an assured vocal, and a Sammy Lowe arrangement." Despite this, Cooke was still largely unhappy with the way it turned out, feeling it missed something. "He had established a way of working with arranger René Hall out on the Coast, and even though Sammy Lowe's string arrangements were not all that different from some of René's, the song still did not say Sam Cooke in the way that some of his earlier Keen hits indelibly, if indefinably, had," said biographer Peter Guralnick. Hugo & Luigi were nonetheless satisfied, and set themselves on making it the follow-up single to "Chain Gang".

"Sad Mood" charted well, but sold only 150,000 copies, roughly one-quarter of the sales of its predecessor.

Personnel
Credits adapted from the liner notes to the 2003 compilation Portrait of a Legend: 1951–1964.
Sam Cooke – vocals
Clifton White – guitar
David Francis – drums
Milton Hinton – bass guitar
Ernie Hayes – piano
Everett Barksdale – violin
Hinda Barnet – violin
Alfred Brown – violin
Max Cahn – violin 
Fred Fradkin – violin  
Archie Levin – violin 
Charles Libove – violin     
Harry Lookofsky – violin  
Ben Miller – violin

Charts and certifications

Weekly charts

References

1960 singles
Sam Cooke songs
Songs written by Sam Cooke
1960 songs
RCA Victor singles
Song recordings produced by Hugo & Luigi